Fullscreen may refer to:

 Fullscreen (aspect ratio), an aspect ratio of 4:3 (as opposed to widescreen (>1.37:1))
 Fullscreen, in computing, a display which covers the full screen without the operating system's typical window-framing interface
 Fullscreen (company), an American entertainment company and multi-channel network